The Nikon F-401 (N4004 in North America) was a beginner's level, autofocus, 35mm, single-lens reflex (SLR) film camera built by Nikon and introduced in 1987. The camera represented one of Nikon's first endeavours into consumer-based autofocus, as a follow-up to their first autofocus SLR in 1986, the Nikon F-501 (known as the N2020 in North America). The camera lacked many of the advanced features that more seasoned amateurs and professionals required, but it was a harbinger of the future as it included a pronounced, built-in grip as well as an integrated TTL Flash that is now commonplace on all but the most high-end SLR cameras.

The F-401 introduced the now common-place feature of using a thumbwheel instead of lens aperture ring to adjust the aperture.  Furthermore, the camera's lack of support for AI lenses meant that while all previous Nikon lenses could be mounted to the camera, none supported automatic exposure TTL metering. 

By the 1990s, the F-401 was part of a lineup of autofocus consumer SLRs that included the more expensive Nikon F-601 and Nikon F-801.

External links

F401
F401